Maytown is a town in Jefferson County, Alabama, United States. It is northwest from the Birmingham suburb of  Pleasant Grove. It incorporated in October 1956. At the 2010 census the population was 385, down from 435 in 2000. This area was damaged by an F5 tornado on April 8, 1998.

Geography
Maytown is located at  (33.553498, -86.994471).

Demographics

2020 census

As of the 2020 United States census, there were 316 people, 133 households, and 86 families residing in the town.

2000 census
As of the census of 2000, there were 435 people, 161 households, and 129 families residing in the town. The racial makeup of the town was 79.31% White, 19.08% Black or African American, 0.69% Native American, 0.23% Asian, and 0.69% from two or more races.

There were 161 households, out of which 26.7% had children under the age of 18 living with them, 65.2% were married couples living together, 13.7% had a female householder with no husband present, and 19.3% were non-families. 17.4% of all households were made up of individuals, and 8.1% had someone living alone who was 65 years of age or older. The average household size was 2.70 and the average family size was 3.05.

In the town, the population was spread out, with 21.8% under the age of 18, 8.5% from 18 to 24, 26.4% from 25 to 44, 28.0% from 45 to 64, and 15.2% who were 65 years of age or older. The median age was 39 years. For every 100 females, there were 95.1 males. For every 100 females age 18 and over, there were 87.8 males.

The median income for a household in the town was $42,083, and the median income for a family was $44,038. Males had a median income of $31,250 versus $22,250 for females. The per capita income for the town was $15,125. About 7.9% of families and 10.0% of the population were below the poverty line, including 15.1% of those under age 18 and 12.7% of those age 65 or over.

References

Towns in Jefferson County, Alabama
Towns in Alabama
Birmingham metropolitan area, Alabama